Cedar Township, Kansas may refer to:

 Cedar Township, Chase County, Kansas
 Cedar Township, Cowley County, Kansas
 Cedar Township, Jackson County, Kansas
 Cedar Township, Smith County, Kansas
 Cedar Township, Wilson County, Kansas

See also 
 List of Kansas townships
 Cedar Township (disambiguation)

Kansas township disambiguation pages